Arosa Sociedad Cultural is a Spanish football team based in Vilagarcía de Arousa, in the autonomous community of Galicia. Founded in 1945, it plays in Segunda División RFEF – Group 1, holding home games at Estadio A Lomba, with a capacity of 5,000 seats.

Season to season

1 season in Segunda División
7 seasons in Segunda División B
1 season in Segunda División RFEF
55 seasons in Tercera División

Honours
Tercera División: 1992–93

Selected former players
 Ignacio Cantero
 Rubén Coméndez
 Manuel Jiménez
 Emilio López

References

External links
Official website 
Futbolme.com profile
Club & stadium history from Estadios de España 

Football clubs in Galicia (Spain)
Association football clubs established in 1945
1945 establishments in Spain
Segunda División clubs